The Walled City of Kaesong surround the royal castle, Manwoldae. The walls have a total length of 23 km and are partially preserved.

The walls were built using the surrounding landscape as a defensive structure (Korean city walls were generally constructed on the crests of hills), following the principles of geomancy. The inner walls were first constructed in 919 while outer walls were built between 1009 and 1029. Small walls have likely been present on the site since the Silla period; the walls were made from beaten earth during the Koryo dynasty. Many portions were rebuilt with stone during the 14th Century. A large portion of the stone walls still exist into modern times, and parts of the earthen walls are still visible. The exterior wall date from the 11th Century and the interior wall from the 14th Century.

The walls had around twenty gates, many of which survive today.

It is listed as a National Treasures of North Korea.

Four walls
Kungsong (Manwoldae)
Hwangsong (Parochamsong)
Naesong (Panwolsong)
Oesong (Rasong)

References

External links
Parochamsong - North Korean Human geography of the Institute for Peace Affairs 
Kaesong-yetsong - North Korean Human geography of the Institute for Peace Affairs 

National Treasures of North Korea
Castles in North Korea
Kaesong
Buildings and structures in North Hwanghae Province
Historic Monuments and Sites in Kaesong